See Garmali for namesakes

Garmali Moti is a village and former non-salute princely state in Gujarat, western India, ruled by Kathi Kshatriyas.

It lies in Sorath prant on Saurashtra peninsula.

History 
Garmali Moti was a petty princely state, comprising solely the village, ruled by Kathi Chieftains.

It had a population of 385 in 1901, yielding a state revenue of 4,700 Rupees (1903-4, mostly from land) and a paying a tribute of 220 Rupees, to the Gaekwar Baroda State and Junagadh State.

External links and Sources 
History
 Imperial Gazetteer, on dsal.uchicago.edu - Kathiawar

Princely states of Gujarat